Capalaba is an electoral division of the Legislative Assembly of Queensland in the state of Queensland, Australia. The electorate is centred on the suburb of Capalaba, in Redland City east of Brisbane, and includes parts of the adjoining suburbs of Alexandra Hills and Birkdale.

Members for Capalaba

Election results

References

External links
 Electorate profile (Antony Green, ABC)

Capalaba
Capalaba, Queensland